Mississippi Chancery Courts are courts of equity. They also have jurisdiction over family law, sanity hearings, wills, and constitutional law. In counties with no County Court, they have jurisdiction over juveniles. Typically, trials are heard without a jury, but juries are permitted. There are 20 districts.

Elections 
Judges in Mississippi Chancery Courts are elected every four years in a nonpartisan election. Judges are required to have five years of experience as a practicing attorney, to be at least 26 years old, to have lived in Mississippi for at least five years, and to live within the court's district.

Districts 
Mississippi Chancery Courts are divided into the following 20 districts.

See also 
 Courts of Mississippi
The Summons, a novel about a Chancery Court judge

References

External links 

Mississippi state courts
Courts and tribunals with year of establishment missing